Muttettugoda Grama Niladhari Division is a Grama Niladhari Division of the Kaduwela Divisional Secretariat of Colombo District of Western Province, Sri Lanka. It has Grama Niladhari Division Code 477B.

Muttettugoda is a surrounded by the Udumulla South, Batapotha, Thalahena South, Thalangama North B, Pothuarawa and Thalangama North A Grama Niladhari Divisions.

Demographics

Ethnicity 
The Muttettugoda Grama Niladhari Division has a Sinhalese majority (95.9%). In comparison, the Kaduwela Divisional Secretariat (which contains the Muttettugoda Grama Niladhari Division) has a Sinhalese majority (95.6%)

Religion 
The Muttettugoda Grama Niladhari Division has a Buddhist majority (92.1%). In comparison, the Kaduwela Divisional Secretariat (which contains the Muttettugoda Grama Niladhari Division) has a Buddhist majority (90.4%)

References 

Grama Niladhari Divisions of Kaduwela Divisional Secretariat